The Reverend Endicott Peabody (May 31, 1857 – November 17, 1944) was the American Episcopal priest who founded the Groton School for Boys (known today simply as Groton School), in Groton, Massachusetts in 1884. Peabody also founded St. Andrew's Episcopal Church in Ayer, Massachusetts, in October 1889. Peabody served as headmaster at the school from 1884 until 1940 and also served as a trustee at Lawrence Academy at Groton.

In 1926, Peabody founded Brooks School, which was named for 19th-century clergyman Phillips Brooks, a well-known preacher and resident of North Andover, Massachusetts. Peabody was the headmaster for Franklin D. Roosevelt's time at Groton, and he officiated at Franklin's marriage to Eleanor Roosevelt, as well as those of their children. A 1944 Time magazine article described him as "the most famed U.S. headmaster of his generation".

Early life
Peabody was born in Salem, Massachusetts on May 31, 1857, the son of Samuel Endicott Peabody and Marianne Cabot Lee (daughter of John Clarke Lee). His father was a Boston merchant and a partner in the London banking firm of J. S. Morgan and Company (later known as J.P. Morgan & Company). His first cousin was Alice Lee Roosevelt, first wife of American President Theodore Roosevelt.

When Peabody was 13, the family moved to England.  He prepared for university at Cheltenham College, a secondary school in Cheltenham, Gloucestershire, finishing in 1876 at the age of 19.  He was graduated from Trinity College, Cambridge, in 1880 with an LL.B. degree.  He married his first cousin, Fannie Peabody, daughter of Francis and Helen (Bloodgood) Peabody of Salem, Massachusetts, on June 18, 1885, in Salem. His father, Samuel, and her father, Francis, were brothers. They had six children.

His great-grandfather was Salem shipowner and privateer Joseph Peabody, who made a fortune importing pepper from Sumatra. Joseph Peabody was one of the wealthiest men in the United States at the time of his death in 1844. Another of his ancestors was Massachusetts Bay Colony Governor John Endecott, who ordered the hanging of nonconformist Quakers, but who nonetheless was a friend of Roger Williams.

Seminary service
In 1882, after his first semester at the Episcopal Theological School in Cambridge, Massachusetts (now the Episcopal Divinity School), Peabody was invited to take charge of a little Episcopal congregation in Tombstone, Arizona.  After a long seven-day train ride from Boston, he arrived in Benson, Arizona, and took the Sandy Bob stagecoach to Tombstone, arriving on January 29, 1882, three months after the "Gunfight at the O.K. Corral".

The previous church had burned down six months previously, and the reverend whom Peabody was replacing had left after only two months. Peabody held his first services in the Miner's Exchange Building on February 5, 1882. Though he felt unqualified, with less than a year of seminary to his credit, he was successful in attracting a considerable congregation. Part of his success was his outreach; he sometimes visited up to 15 homes a day.

Over a few months, he succeeded in getting St. Paul's Episcopal Church built for approximately $5,000. (It was added to the National Register of Historic Places in 1971.) The first services were held there June 18, 1882.

Peabody was able to raise the funds during a short amount of time because he was not afraid to go door-to-door for donations, including asking at the town's saloons. This outgoing manner helped him make many friends, including Wyatt Earp, whose family donated the altar rail for the new church.

He also was impressive physically, never losing a boxing match. He began a baseball team in Tombstone. Town newspaper Epitaph wrote of him, "Well, we've got a parson who doesn't flirt with girls, who doesn't drink behind the door and when it comes to baseball, he's a daisy."

Though he was warmly embraced in Tombstone, he wrote of his homesickness in his diaries. He left Tombstone after only six months, and many were saddened that he had to go. George Whitwell Parson noted in his diary that day, "We will not easily fill Peabody's place." He returned to the East Coast and completed his studies at the Episcopal Theological School, graduating in the spring of 1884.

Following the 125th anniversary of the building of the church, he was added to the liturgical calendar of the Episcopal Diocese of Arizona, with November 17 becoming his feast day.  He is thus regarded as the 'patron saint' of the Episcopal Diocese of Arizona and venerated as one of its most important missionaries.

Founding of Groton School
Peabody's primary mission was to replicate for American schoolboys the type of education he had experienced in England. He considered Rugby School a particular model for its dual emphases on sports and classics. The curriculum was targeted specifically at boys from upper-class families, whom Peabody wished to steer toward moral leadership and philanthropy, and emphasized moral development over intellectual. His school received early support from the Roosevelt family, including future U.S. President Theodore Roosevelt, and filled quickly.

The school opened in 1884, and Peabody served as its headmaster until 1940. Its students included Theodore Roosevelt's four sons as well as his cousin, future president Franklin D. Roosevelt. Peabody was a strict master;  despite many of the students being from wealthy families, he refused to allow any student to receive more than 25 cents per week in allowance.

He died in Groton on November 17, 1944.

Honors
Peabody was elected a member of the American Antiquarian Society in 1891.

Legacy
Franklin Roosevelt said of Peabody, "As long as I live his influence will mean more to me than that of any other people next to my father and mother," and cited him as “the biggest influence in my life.”

As thirteen-year-old W. Averell Harriman described him in a letter home: “You know he would be an awful bully if he wasn’t such a terrible Christian.”

His family has been called Boston Brahmins. His son Malcolm E. Peabody was bishop of the Episcopal Diocese of Central New York. Massachusetts Governor Endicott Peabody was his grandson. His great-grandchildren include author Frances FitzGerald, model Penelope Tree, and actress Kyra Sedgwick.

References

Further reading
 A Church for Helldorado: the 1882 Tombstone Diary of Endicott Peabody by S.J. Reidhead

External links
Groton School
Brooks School

1857 births
1944 deaths
People from Salem, Massachusetts
American Episcopalians
American people of English descent
Schoolteachers from Massachusetts
Founders of schools in the United States
Heads of American boarding schools
Members of the American Antiquarian Society
Endicott (elder)